Plundered Hearts is an interactive fiction video game created by Amy Briggs and published by Infocom in 1987. Infocom's only game in the romance genre, it was released simultaneously for the Commodore 64, Atari 8-bit family, Atari ST, Amiga, Macintosh, and DOS. It is Infocom's twenty-eighth game.

Plot
Plundered Hearts casts the player in a well-defined role. The lead character is a young woman in the late 17th century who has received a letter. Jean Lafond, the governor of the small West Indies island of St. Sinistra, says that the player's father has contracted a "wasting tropical disease". Lafond suggests that his recovery would be greatly helped by the loving presence of his daughter, and sends his ship (the Lafond Deux) to transport her.

As the game begins, the ship is attacked by pirates and the player's character is kidnapped. Eventually the player's character finds that two men are striving for her affections: dashing pirate Nicholas Jamison, and the conniving Jean Lafond. As the intrigue plays out, the lady does not sit idly by and watch the men duel over her; she must help Jamison overcome the evil plans of Lafond so they have a chance to live happily ever after.

Development
As early as 1984 Infocom employees joked about the possibility of a romance text adventure, although The Boston Globe observed that "somehow the moves don't seem appropriate to a computer keyboard". By 1987, the year of Plundered Hearts'''s release, Infocom no longer rated its games on difficulty level.

Although this was not the only Infocom game designed in an effort to attract female players (see also Moonmist), it is the only game in which the lead character is always female.

Release
The Plundered Hearts package included an "elegant velvet reticule" (pouch) containing the following items:
A 50 guinea banknote from St. Sinistra
A letter from Jean Lafond reporting the illness of the player character's father

Reception
Game reviewers Hartley, Patricia, and Kirk Lesser complimented the game in their "The Role of Computers" column in Dragon #128 (1987), citing its "gripping prose, challenging predicaments, and scenes of derring-do". Compute! praised Plundered Hearts writing and said that the game was suitable for both men and women. ANALOG Computing approved of the game's "intrigue, adventure and, yes, romance" but regretted that "most of Infocom's regular audience (presumably male) are likely to forsake this bold new endeavor" because of its genre.

ReviewsACE (Advanced Computer Entertainment) (Jan, 1988)Commodore Computing International (Jan, 1988)Zzap! (Jan, 1988)Happy Computer (Nov, 1987)SPAG (Mar 02, 1995)Computer and Video Games (Dec, 1987)Commodore User'' (Jan, 1988)

References

External links 
 Package, documentation, and feelies
 Infocom-if.org entry
 

1980s interactive fiction
1987 video games
Adventure games
Amiga games
Apple II games
Atari 8-bit family games
Atari ST games
Classic Mac OS games
Commodore 64 games
DOS games
Infocom games
Video games about pirates
Video games developed in the United States
Video games featuring female protagonists